Bedřich Köhler (born February 14, 1985) is a Czech professional ice hockey player currently with HC Zlín in the Czech Extraliga.

He has previously played for HC Vítkovice Steel, Mountfield HK and HC Kometa Brno.

References

External links

1985 births
Living people
Czech ice hockey forwards
HC Havířov players
HC Kometa Brno players
Sportspeople from Ostrava
Stadion Hradec Králové players
HC Vítkovice players
PSG Berani Zlín players